Luis Alberto Romero (born June 15, 1968 in Montevideo) is a former Uruguayan footballer who played for clubs in China, Peru and Italy.

Honours
Peñarol 
 Uruguayan Primera División: 1995, 1996, 1997

Shandong Luneng
 Chinese Jia-A League: 1999
 Chinese FA Cup:1999

Nacional
 Uruguayan Primera División: 2005, 2005–06

References

External links
 
 

1968 births
Living people
Uruguayan footballers
Uruguayan expatriate footballers
Uruguay international footballers
Uruguayan Primera División players
Serie A players
Sud América players
Club Nacional de Football players
Cagliari Calcio players
Peñarol players
Central Español players
Club Alianza Lima footballers
Shandong Taishan F.C. players
Club Atlético River Plate (Montevideo) players
Cerro Largo F.C. players
Expatriate footballers in Peru
Expatriate footballers in Italy
Expatriate footballers in China
Association football forwards